Pierre François Joseph Benoit Rosalvo Bobo (1874–1929), known as Rosalvo Bobo, was a Haitian politician, and a leader of the rebel faction known as the Cacos. In March of 1915 he started and led a rebellion against the government of President Jean Vilbrun Guillaume Sam. With the rebellion going against him Guillaume Sam ordered the arrest and murder of his political opponents, and was himself killed by a mob in retaliation on 27 July 1915. This led to a breakdown of order and widespread violence in the capitol of Port-au-Prince. In response the United States landed U.S. Marines at Port-au-Prince on 28 July 1915, beginning the 1915 occupation of Haiti.

U.S. Admiral William B. Caperton was the commander of the American occupation troops in Haiti after the assassination of President Jean Vilbrun Guillaume Sam. and, under orders from Washington DC sought to find a suitable candidate to assume the presidency. Two names emerged, Bobo and Philippe Sudré Dartiguenave. After interviewing both men Caperton formed the opinion that Bobo was mentally unstable and unfit for any office.  He informed Washington of this and was told by assistant secretary of the Navy Franklin D Roosevelt that "the election of Dartiguenave is preferred by the United States".   After losing the election in the Haitian Senate by a vote of 94 to 3, Bobo first fled to Cuba, but then moved on to Jamaica. He finally settled in France, where he died in 1929.

References

1874 births
1929 deaths
Finance ministers of Haiti
Haitian politicians
Haitian emigrants to France